The 1941 Miami Hurricanes football team was an American football team that represented the University of Miami  as a member of the Southern Intercollegiate Athletic Association (SIAA) in the 1941 college football season. In their fifth season under head coach Jack Harding, the Hurricanes compiled an 8–2 record and outscored opponents by a total of 162 to 54. The team's victories included games against Texas Tech (6–0), South Carolina (7–6), and VMI (10–7); its losses were to Florida (0–14) and Alabama (7–21). The team was not ranked in the 1941 NCAA football rankings.

The Hurricanes played nine of their ten games at Burdine Stadium in Miami, Florida. The Florida–Miami football rivalry game was played on a Saturday night, and the other home games were played on Friday nights.

Key players included halfback Russell Coates.

Schedule

References

Miami
Miami Hurricanes football seasons
Miami Hurricanes football